Dahijuri is a village and a gram panchayat in the Binpur I CD block in the Jhargram subdivision of the Jhargram district in the state of West Bengal, India.

Socio-political turmoil
Dahijuri was a centre of violent Maoist activity during the Lalgarh movement days around 2009–2011.
Now Dahijuri has become stable and free from violent and Maoist activity. Total 10 Gram Panchayat is under Dahijuri Gram Panchayat.

Geography

Location
Dahijuri is located at

Area overview
Jhargram subdivision, the only one in Jhargram district, shown in the map alongside, is composed of hills, mounds and rolling lands. It is rather succinctly described in the District Human Development Report, 2011 (at that time it was part of Paschim Medinipur district), "The western boundary is more broken and picturesque, for the lower ranges of the Chhotanagpur Hills line the horizon, the jungle assumes the character of forest, and large trees begin to predominate. The soil, however, is lateritic, a considerable area is unproductive, almost uninhabited, especially in the extreme north-west where there are several hills over 1000 feet in height. The remainder of the country is an almost level plain broken only by the sand hills". 3.48% of the population lives in urban areas and 96.52% lives in the rural areas. 20.11% of the total population belonged to scheduled castes and 29.37% belonged to scheduled tribes.

Note: The map alongside presents some of the notable locations in the subdivision. All places marked in the map are linked in the larger full screen map.

Demographics
According to the 2011 Census of India, Dahijuri had a total population of 3,237 of which 1,597 (49%) were males and 1,640 (51%) were females. Population in the age range 0–6 years was 364. The total number of literate persons in Dahijuri was 2,066 (63.82% of the population over 6 years).

Economy
The State Bank of India has a branch at Dahijuri. Economy mainly depends on the cultivation here. Now S.B.I came with their first A.T.M to give a new economic push.

Transport
State Highway 5 running from Rupnarayanpur (in Bardhaman district) to Junput (in Purba Medinipur district) passes through Dahijuri. Dahijuri-Kanajpal-Lalgarh, Dahijuri-Dherua, Dahijuri-Parihati Roads converge on this place.

Education
Dahijuri Mahatma Vidyapith was established in 1948. It is a co-educational Bengali-medium higher secondary school.

References

Villages in Jhargram district